is a manga series by Moebius and Jirō Taniguchi, published in Japan in 1997. It belongs to the genre science fiction and has been translated into German, French and other languages.

Synopsis 
The boy Icaro can fly since he was born. He was taken away from his mother and grew up in the care of the government, which tried to research his abilities. Icaro falls in love with one of the researchers and discovers his own free will. He tries to escape his prison before they are able to take away his urge for freedom from him.

Development and release 
The series is based on Moebius's scenario and was drawn by Jirō Taniguchi. According to Moebius's first draft, the manga should have a total of 10,000 pages. Taniguchi, however, was given a free hand in the realization and shortened the plot to almost 300 pages.

The series was published in 1997 in Morning magazine by Kodansha in Japan. It was also published by Bijutsu Shuppansha in an anthology in 2000. A translation into French, as well as  Italian and Polish, was published by Kana. An English version was published by Simon & Schuster. The German translation of the manga was published in 2016 by Schreiber & Leser in a single volume.

Reception 
Peter Osteried described the work as a great collaboration between the two well-known artists. Besides the European influences in Taniguchi's style, influences from Katsuhiro Otomo's Akira can be seen, who in turn was influenced by Moebius. All in all, the work is a "perfect synthesis of French-Belgian and Japanese comics". Lars von Törne underlines in the Tagesspiegel that the work shows how important western comics were for Taniguchi's style.

References

External links 
 

Manga series
1997 manga
Jiro Taniguchi
Kodansha manga
Seinen manga